Stoll is an unincorporated community located in Menifee County, Kentucky, United States.

References

Unincorporated communities in Menifee County, Kentucky
Unincorporated communities in Kentucky